Nikolay Lebedenko was a Russian military engineer, mostly known as the main developer of the Lebedenko Tank, or the Tsar Tank, which was the largest armored vehicle in history, constructed in 1916–1917. Lebedenko was employed in a private firm, that worked for the Russian War Department, designing artillery devices before and during World War I, as well as the bomb release mechanism for the Ilya Muromets bomber.

There is little known about the biography of Lebedenko or his year of birth and death. During the war, he owned a private laboratory on Sadovaya-Kudrinskaya Street in Moscow, where he developed his projects for the Imperial Russian Army, including the Tsar Tank. His idea intrigued Nikolai Zhukovsky, a scientist he had met earlier in a scientific and medical conference before the war, and thus, development began. After he left Russia for the United States in the autumn of 1917, nothing is known about the fate of Lebedenko. It is quite possible, however, that Lebedenko died a quiet natural death, being about 70 years old in 1917.

References
Lebedenko (or Tsar) Tank

Russian inventors
Year of birth missing
Year of death missing
Russian military engineers